George Merriam (January 20, 1803 –  June 22, 1880) was an American publisher. With his brother Charles, he founded G. and C. Merriam, which would eventually become Merriam-Webster, Inc.

The Merriam family were printers, book manufacturers, and booksellers in Worcester County in the latter part of the 18th century. George worked on his father's farm in West Brookfield until he was age 15, then entered his uncle Ebenezer's West Brookfield printing office as an apprentice, and on reaching his majority became a partner. In 1831 he moved to Springfield with his brother Charles, and established in 1832 the publishing house of G. and C. Merriam. Their earliest publications were law books, editions of the Bible, and school books. After the death of Noah Webster, the lexicographer, the Merriams purchased the right of future publication of Webster's Dictionary.

References
 

1803 births
19th-century births
1880 deaths
American publishers (people)
Businesspeople from Worcester, Massachusetts
People from West Brookfield, Massachusetts
19th-century American businesspeople